Psilocarphus elatior is a species of flowering plant in the family Asteraceae known by the common names tall woollyheads, meadow woollyheads and tall woolly-marbles. It is native to the Pacific Northwest in western North America from Vancouver Island, where it is known from just a few occurrences,  to northern California. It grows in seasonally moist spots such as meadows, spring seeps, and vernal pools.

This is a small erect annual herb growing up to about 15 centimeters tall with a pale silvery or gray-green branching stem coated in woolly or cobwebby fibers. The leaves are linear or lance-shaped and up to about 3.5 centimeters long. They are located along the stem and there are no basal leaves.

The inflorescence is a small, spherical flower head less than a centimeter wide located at the tip of the stem or in a leaf axils. It is a cluster of several tiny woolly disc flowers surrounded by leaflike bracts but no phyllaries. Each tiny flower is covered in a scale which is densely woolly with long white fibers, making the developing head appear cottony.

References

External links
Jepson Manual Treatment
USDA Plants Profile
Flora of North America

Gnaphalieae
Flora of the West Coast of the United States
Flora of British Columbia
Flora of California
Flora without expected TNC conservation status